Arras Cathedral (French: Cathédrale Notre-Dame-et-Saint-Vaast d'Arras) is the Catholic church in the city of Arras, France. The cathedral is the seat of the Bishops of Arras.

History
The original cathedral of Arras, constructed between 1030 and 1396, was one of the most beautiful Gothic structures in northern France, until it was destroyed in the French Revolution. The cathedral was the resting place of Louis de Bourbon, Légitimé de France, a legitimated son of Louis XIV and Louise de La Vallière.

Abbey Church of Saint-Vaast
The church of the former St. Vaast's Abbey was rebuilt beginning in 1750 in neoclassical style. The design was chosen by the former abbot of St. Vaast's, the Cardinal de Rohan, and is of remarkable simplicity. It is 'a very large building, the erection of which was begun in 1755 from plans by Pierre Contant d'Ivry, the architect who later created designs for the Church of La Madeleine in Paris. The work was interrupted during the Revolution. 

After the Revolution, the Abbey Church was designated as to replace the destroyed cathedral. Work resumed by virtue of a municipal decree dated “Nivôse 27, Year XII”, which ran: “... to erect the edifice, abandoning everything in the original plans connected with decoration and architectural beauty, limiting the work to the requirements of solidity and decency.” 

The church was finished in accordance with these prescriptions, being completed in 1834. The interior was of plaster-coated brickwork, whilst the columns were of undressed stone, covered with stone-coloured mortar. The capitals were of stucco-work.'

Description
]
Arras Cathedral was heavily damaged by shelling in April 1917, during the run-up to the Nivelle offensives of World War I, and subsequently rebuilt in its previous form.

A marble statue of the Virgin with Child by Jean-Pierre Cortot was donated by Louis XVIII.

Sculptor Marcel Gaumont did considerable work on the cathedral. The pulpit depicts Christ amongst his disciples and the four evangelists. He also provided the baptismal font which shows on one side the baptism of Jesus by John the Baptist, and on the other Saint Vaast blessing a group of people. Alexandre Descatoire did the Stations of the Cross.

The cathedral is adjacent to the Musée des beaux-arts d'Arras, formerly the Benedictine Abbey of Saint-Vaast.

References

Roman Catholic cathedrals in France
Basilica churches in France
Churches in Pas-de-Calais
Buildings and structures in Arras
Monuments historiques of Pas-de-Calais